Balaguer is the capital of the comarca of Noguera, in the province of Lleida, Catalonia, Spain. It is located by the river Segre, a tributary to the Ebre. The municipality includes an exclave to the east. Balaguer also has a sister city in the western United States, Pacifica, California.

Balaguer was conquered from the Moors by Ermengol VI of Urgell in 1106; he made it his new capital, and it remained so for subsequent counts of Urgell.

The town has a Gothic bridge, the "Pont de Sant Miquel", over the Segre river. This bridge was destroyed during the Spanish Civil War in the battle of "Cap de Pont" (bridgehead battle in 1938) and rebuilt after the war.

Another Gothic building is the Santa Maria Church, in the heights above the city, in line with a quite finely conserved wall dating to the 15th century AD.

The historic town is on the right bank of the Segre but, following the Spanish Civil War, construction began on a modern bridge, which initiated development of a modern extension of the town on the left bank.

General Franco's forces first entered Catalonia from Aragon in 1938 through Balaguer's bridgehead.

Notable natives
Josep Ivan Argelaga, performance artists "dogman"
Gaspar de Portolà, founder of San Diego (United States) and Monterey (United States).
Peter IV of Aragon, King of the Crown of Aragon.
Antoni Torres García, footballer
Xavier Sánchez Bernat, basketball player
Roberto Martínez, former footballer and football manager of the Belgium national football team
Teresa Pàmies, writer, political activist and mother of Sergi Pàmies.
Felipe Cardeña, artist

See also
Lord of Balaguer
Balaguer Offensive

References

Palomero, Aaron Gutiérrez, "Planificación urbana y vivienda obrera en Balaguer (1939 – 1962). Ocupación del margen izquierdo" Scripta Nova: Revista Electrónica de Geografía y Ciencias Sociales, Vol. VII, núm. 146(025), 1 de agosto de 2003.

External links

Official municipal web site 
 Government data pages 

Municipalities in Noguera (comarca)
Populated places in Noguera (comarca)